The GSIS Museo ng Sining (English: GSIS Museum of Art) or the GSIS Museum is an art museum in Pasay, Metro Manila, Philippines established in April 1996.  It is located at the GSIS Building within the Financial Center Area of Bay City. The museum features artworks of Filipino artists from the colonial period to contemporary period and also serves as an exhibit area for Filipino artists.

In December 2011, a total of 308 artworks are in the museum's collection.

Among its collections is a commissioned copy of Ritual Dance by Fernando Amorsolo-the original copy is lost in 1972, and the History of Philippine Music dated 1931. The Parisian Life by Juan Luna estimated in 2009 to value around P200 million, was formerly part of the museum's collections but was transferred to the National Museum of Fine Arts in 2012 along with other selected works.

References

Museums established in 1996
Art museums and galleries in the Philippines
Museums in Pasay
1996 establishments in the Philippines